Juliet Gilkes Romero is a writer for stage and screen.

Life
Juliet Gilkes Romero is a British writer for stage and screen. She is Writer in Residence at the National Theatre 2022/2023 attached to the New Works Department. Juliet is the recipient of the 2020 Alfred Fagon Award for Best New Play with The Whip, the Roland Rees Bursary 2019 (named in honour of the co-founder of the Alfred Fagon Award), the Writers Guild of Great Britain Best play Award 2009 with At The Gates of Gaza and the BBC World Service Alexander Onassis Research Bursary.

Juliet’s earlier work as a BBC foreign affairs reporter and producer for BBC World Service Radio and BBC World TV saw her reporting from countries including Ethiopia, Cuba, Haiti  and the Dominican Republic.

She gained a Master's Degree in Writing for Performance from Goldsmiths, University of London in 2001. Gilkes Romero was a Creative Fellow at the University of Birmingham in 2018.

Of Caribbean descent, Juliet Gilkes Romero was born in East London and grew up in Suffolk.

Awards and honours
2009 Writers' Guild Award for At the Gates of Gaza

BBC World Service Alexander Onassis Research Bursary

In 2019, she won the Roland Rees Bursary, named in honour of the co-founder of the Alfred Fagon Award.

In 2020 she was the recipient of the Alfred Fagon Award for Best New Play with The Whip

Plays
 Bilad Al-Sudan at the Tricycle Theatre (now Kiln) as part of its 2006 season dealing with genocidal conflict in Darfur, 2006.
 At The Gates of Gaza, Birmingham Repertory Theatre & tour
 Upper Cut at the Southwark Playhouse 2015
 Day of The Living (as part of RSC’s Mischief Festival 2018 with Darren Clark and Amy Draper) 2018
 The Whip at the RSC’s Swan Theatre 2020
The Gift (a retelling of Medea filmed for Jermyn Street Theatre’s 15 Heroines of Greek Tragedy season) 2020

Screen and Audio
 Soon Gone; A Windrush Chronicle co-produced by Sir Lenny Henry’s production company Douglas Road and the Young Vic Theatre
 One Hot Summer broadcast on BBC Radio 4

References

External links
 Juliet Gilkes Romero
Lisa Richards Creatives

Year of birth missing (living people)
Living people
21st-century British dramatists and playwrights
British journalists